Restless Night is the debut album by Irish musician Ray Dolan. It was released in 1975 in Ireland by EMI Ireland and produced by Leo O'Kelly.

Track listing

Personnel
Ray Dolan – guitars, vocals
Paul Barrett – keyboards, bass guitar, trombone, vibraphone, recorder, bongos
Sonny Condell – guitars, backing vocals
Brian Dunning – flutes
Leo O'Kelly – guitars, fiddle, ukulele, backing vocals
Philip King – harmonica on "Restless Night"
Desi Reynolds – drums, congas
Bridget & Siobhan Hefferman, Pat Armstrong – backing vocals

Production
 Leo O'Kelly – production
 Paul Barrett – arrangements
Walter Samuel, Keith Manfield – engineering
Ronnie Norton – cover design & photography

Release history

1975 debut albums
EMI Records albums
Albums produced by Leo O'Kelly